The Maple Hisoon or Maple Haixun (海迅), also known as the SMA Huapu Hyun, is a compact sedan and hatchback produced by the Chinese automaker Shanghai Maple.

Overview
The Maple Haixun hatchback was available from 2004 with three variants dubbed the Biaofeng (飙风) or Whirlwind, M203 and AA featuring different front end designs. The Biaofeng variant was launched in August 2003, and both the entry level Biaofeng variant and the sporty AA variant were offered for the 2004 and 2005 model years. The M203 variant is the only variant available as of 2014.

The Maple Haixun MA compact sedan was launched in January 2007 alongside the Haiyu MB sedan. The engine of the 2007 Haixun MA compact sedan is a 1.5-litre inline-4 engine producing 94hp and a 1.8-litre inline-4 engine producing 113hp. Both engine models are mated to a 5-speed manual transmission. The engine of the Haixun MA utilizes fuel injection technology supplied by Bosch.

Design controversies
The Maple Haixun five-door hatchback has been rumoured to be a copy of the Citroën ZX and Fukang with tail lamps inspired by the Honda Civic sedan at the time. The Haixun 4-door sedan is a rebadged variant of the Maple Haifeng and Haiyu compact sedans. The Maple Hisoon was discontinued in 2010.

References

 Auto Express 15 March 2006 page 46 - Inside Story - Double Trouble

Hisoon
Compact cars
Front-wheel-drive vehicles
Cars of China

Cars introduced in 2004
2010s cars